Palace of Sports "Yunist" is an indoor arena in the eastern Ukrainian city Zaporizhia. Rebuilt in 2018, it has a seating capacity for 3,200 people and is a home arena of HC Motor Zaporizhzhia.

See also
 Motor Sich

References

External links
 https://yunostpalace.com.ua/en/ (official website)

Indoor arenas in Ukraine
Sport in Zaporizhzhia
Buildings and structures in Zaporizhzhia
Motor Sich